Archduke Johann Salvator of Austria (25 November 1852 – declared dead in absentia 2 February 1911) was a member of the Tuscan branch of the House of Habsburg-Lorraine. He was Archduke and Prince of Austria, Prince of Hungary, Bohemia and Tuscany. After renouncing those titles, he was known as Johann (John) Orth. He disappeared while sailing with his wife in July 1890 and is believed to have died when his ship encountered a storm near Cape Horn. Archduke Salvator was declared dead in absentia in February 1911.

Early life
Archduke Johann Salvator was born in Florence, the youngest son of Leopold II, Grand Duke of Tuscany and his second wife, Princess Maria Antonia of the Two Sicilies. He was baptized in Florence's Battistero di San Giovanni as Giovanni Nepomuceno Maria Annunziata Giuseppe Giovanni Batista Ferdinando Baldassare Luigi Gonzaga Pietro Alessandrino Zanobi Antonino. He pursued a career in the Austrian Army and was a good friend of Rudolf, Crown Prince of Austria, with both sharing liberal opinions.

After Bulgaria was granted autonomy by the Ottoman Empire, Johann Salvator was an unsuccessful candidate for the throne. Prince Alexander of Battenberg would be elected Prince of Bulgaria in 1879. During the Austro-Hungarian occupation of the Ottoman territory of Bosnia and Herzegovina in 1878, he was put in command of a division of the occupying army and won numerous honours.

On 16 October 1889, he resigned his army commission and renounced his title and the privileges he enjoyed as a member of the Austrian Imperial Family. After renouncing his titles he assumed the name "Johann (or John) Orth", the surname Orth derived from the name of a castle he had owned, Schloss Orth.

Disappearance
In 1889, Johann Salvator married  Ludmilla ("Milli") Stubel, an opera dancer in London. Shortly after his marriage, he purchased a ship named the Santa Margareta, on which he and his wife sailed for South America. In February 1890 he set off from Montevideo, Uruguay, heading for Valparaíso in Chile. He was last seen on 12 July in Cape Tres Puntas, Argentina. It is believed that his ship was lost during a storm off the coast of Cape Horn. He was officially declared dead on 2 February 1911 in Vienna. His possessions were disposed of in 1912.

In the years following Salvator's disappearance, numerous sightings of him were reported. Rumors persisted that he and his wife sailed to South America and assumed new identities. Several men also came forward claiming to be the "missing Duke". One of the more publicised claims came in May 1945 when a German born lithographer living in Kristiansand, Norway named Alexander Hugo Køhler made a deathbed confession claiming that he was Johann Salvator. Køhler claimed that, as Johann Orth, he "bought" the identity of Alexander Hugo Køhler and assumed his life. Køhler claimed that the real Alexander Hugo Køhler posed as Salvator and it was he who died at sea.

Films about the Johann Orth mystery
Das Geheimnis der Santa Margherita (dir. Rolf Randolf, 1921)
A Vanished World (dir. Alexander Korda, 1922)
The Secret of Johann Orth (dir. Willi Wolff, 1932)
The Red Prince (dir. Hans Schott-Schöbinger, 1954)

See also
List of people who disappeared mysteriously at sea

References

External links
 

1852 births
1910s missing person cases
1911 deaths
Austrian princes
Disappeared princes
Italian Roman Catholics
House of Habsburg-Lorraine
Knights of the Golden Fleece of Austria
Military personnel from Florence
Missing person cases in Chile
Nobility from Florence
People declared dead in absentia
People lost at sea
Sons of monarchs